Rencontres (English title: Meetings) is a 1962 French language motion picture drama directed by Philippe Agostini who co-wrote screenplay with Odette Joyeux and Bertram L. Lonsdale.

Synopsis
The film depicts the holiday love affair in which a woman has a disabled brother.

Cast
 Michèle Morgan	as	Bella Krasner
 Gabriele Ferzetti	as	Ralph Scaffari
 Pierre Brasseur	as	Carl Krasner
 Diana Gregor	as	Laurence Krasner
 Jacques Morel	as 	David
 Nico Pepe	as 	José
 Véronique Vendell	as 	Micky

References

External links

French drama films
Films directed by Philippe Agostini
1960s French films
1962 films